Verpa conica, commonly known as the bell morel or the early morel, is a species of fungi in the family Morchellaceae. Sometimes mistaken for a true morel (genus Morchella), this species is an “early morel” characterized by a cap resembling a thimble that is freely attached to the stem.

Taxonomy
The species was first described under the name Phallus conicus by Otto Friedrich Müller in 1775. Later authors have moved the taxon to various genera: Persoon placed in Leotia in 1801, Samuel Frederick Gray transferred it Relhanum in 1821, while Otto Kuntze moved it to Monka in 1898. The species was transferred to Verpa by Olof Swartz in 1814.

Description
The underside of the cap is tan to dark brown in color. It is generally hollow, although young specimens may be filled with cotton-like hyphae. The flesh is thin and brittle, and the cap can be easily broken off the stem.

David Arora notes that sometimes a variety with a wrinkled cap can be found, somewhat resembling a Gyromitra.

Microscopic features
Spores are elliptical, smooth, colorless, hyaline, with dimensions of 28–34 by 15–19 µm. The asci are typically 500–550 by 21–27 µm, and eight spored. The paraphyses are club-shaped, branched, and septate.

Similar species 
Since the cap is free in V. conica, it is easily distinguishable from true morels. True morels attach at the base of the cap. V. conica mushrooms attach at the top of the cap—so they are even distinguishable from half-free morels. This mushroom also tends to be filled with a cotton material, whereas morels are hollow all of the way through.

Other similar species include Verpa bohemica and Mitrophora semilibera.

Distribution and habitat
This species grows singly, scattered, or in groups on the ground in both hardwood and coniferous forests, often in river valleys, or along stream banks. It often fruits in late spring, usually near morel season. It has been reported to fruit abundantly in the chaparral scrubland in southern California.

Edibility
Verpa conica, like Verpa bohemica and closely related Morchella species, are edible once cooked, although caution is advised.

Use as an antioxidant 

There is evidence that V. conica may contain compounds that function as an antioxidant. While not necessarily recommended for consumption, it is possible that an extract from V. conica could be used as an antioxidant supplement. A study done on the antioxidant activity of various mushroom species indicates that this species of Verpa does particularly well in reducing power. They also do well in binding iron, which may be related to peroxidation protection.

References

Morchellaceae
Edible fungi
Fungi described in 1775
Fungi of Europe
Fungi of North America
Taxa named by Otto Friedrich Müller